The 1933–34 Sheffield Shield season was the 38th season of the Sheffield Shield, the domestic first-class cricket competition of Australia. Victoria won the championship.

Table

Statistics

Most Runs
Don Bradman 922

Most Wickets
Chuck Fleetwood-Smith 39 & Clarrie Grimmett 39

References

Sheffield Shield
Sheffield Shield
Sheffield Shield seasons